Cheshire is a census-designated place (CDP) located in the town of Cheshire in Berkshire County, Massachusetts, United States. The population was 514 at the 2010 census, out of 3,235 in the entire town of Cheshire.

Geography
Massachusetts Route 8 passes through the center of the community, leading north to Adams and North Adams and south towards Pittsfield. The CDP sits at the head of the Hoosic River, where it flows out of the Cheshire Reservoir.

Demographics

References

Census-designated places in Berkshire County, Massachusetts
Census-designated places in Massachusetts